The Rajya Sabha (meaning the "Council of States") is the upper house of the Parliament of India. Assam elects 7 seats since 1956 (one more than 1952-1956). Members are indirectly elected by state legislators (elected politicians) of Assam. The number of the seven seats allocated to each party is proportional to the legislators' number at the time of nomination.

Elections within the state legislatures are held using proportional representation via single transferable vote.

Current members
Keys:

BPF,SSP,JP,BJP,IND,UPPL,JAN,ASDC,OTH MP list  
 Star (*) Represents current Rajya Sabha members from as:

AGP MP List

INC MP list

References

Assam
 
Lists of people from Assam